Lyle Bennett (June 23, 1903 – March 24, 2005) was an American football and track coach.  He served as the head football coach at Central Michigan University program from 1947 to 1949, compiling a record of 8–15–1.  Bennett was also the head track coach at Central Michigan from 1947 to 1970.  He attended Central Michigan where he played football and baseball, and ran track.  He also coached at Reed City High School, Rockford High School, and Hastings High School in Michigan.  The outdoor track at Central Michigan University is named for Bennett.

Head coaching record

Football

References

1903 births
2005 deaths
Alma Scots football coaches
Alma Scots football players
Central Michigan Chippewas football coaches
Central Michigan Chippewas football players
Central Michigan Chippewas baseball players
Central Michigan Chippewas men's track and field athletes
Central Michigan Chippewas track and field coaches
People from Kent County, Michigan
People from Mount Pleasant, Michigan
Players of American football from Michigan
American centenarians
Men centenarians